Lyman Underwood Humphrey (July 25, 1844 – September 12, 1915) was the 11th governor of Kansas.

Early life
Humphrey was born in New Baltimore, Ohio, to Lyman and Elizabeth (Everhart) Humphrey, one of two sons born to the couple. His father was born in Connecticut, but relocated to Deerfield, Ohio, where he purchased a tannery formerly owned by Jesse Grant (father of Ulysses S. Grant). Humphrey's father gave up the tannery business after several years and began to practice law. His father died in 1853 and through the influence of his mother, Humphrey received a common school education first in New Baltimore and then high school in Massillon, Ohio. He left school in 1861 to join the 76th Ohio Infantry. He later received his J.D. from the University of Michigan in 1867.

Civil War
The 76th Ohio was part of the Army of the Tennessee. Humphrey rose quickly through the ranks and was promoted to first lieutenant. He participated in twenty-seven battles and skirmishes including Fort Donelson, Shiloh, Corinth, the siege of Vicksburg, Resaca, and Atlanta. The regiment participated in the march to the sea and through the Carolinas to the battle of Bentonville. At Ringgold Gap on November 27, 1863, Humphrey was wounded but missed no duty due to the wound. He was mustered out with the regiment at Louisville, Kentucky on July 19, 1865.

Personal life
Humphrey married Amanda Leonard on December 25, 1872, in Beardstown, Illinois. They had four sons, two of whom died in infancy.

Professional career
Following the Civil War, Humphrey attended Mount Union College for one year followed by a year in the law department of the University of Michigan. Short on funds, Humphrey left school, but was admitted to the Ohio bar in 1868. He moved to Shelby County, Missouri where he became a teacher and newspaper editor of the Shelby County Herald. Humphrey was admitted to the Missouri bar in 1870.

The following year, Humphrey moved to Independence, Kansas, where he practiced law and started the South Kansas Tribune newspaper. He gave up the newspaper a year later and settled into the practice of law full-time, until December 1872 when he helped found the Commercial Bank of Independence. Humphrey became the bank's president and helped reorganize the bank in 1891 as the Commercial National Bank. He continued with the bank until he was elected governor.

Politics
Humphrey was a devoted Republican and was active in party politics in every state in which he lived. In 1872 he unsuccessfully ran for the Kansas House of Representatives because he opposed the issue of railroad bonds. Four years later he was overwhelmingly elected to represent Montgomery County in the Kansas House of Representatives. Before his term expired, Humphrey was appointed the ninth lieutenant governor to fill the vacancy left by Melville J. Salter. During the regular election of 1878, he was elected to the same position by a margin of 40,000 votes. Humphrey completed his term as lieutenant governor and was elected to the Kansas Senate in 1884.

Governor of Kansas
Humphrey ran for governor in 1888 and won the position by the largest plurality to that time in Kansas; he won the majority vote in all but two counties. He defeated the Democratic candidate John Martin (not to be confused with the previous Republican Governor of Kansas John A. Martin). Humphrey was reelected to a second term in 1890.

Later life
Following his term as governor, Humphrey returned to the practice of law. In 1892, he ran unsuccessfully for the United States House of Representatives. Humphrey died at Independence on September 12, 1915, and is buried in Mount Hope Cemetery.

See also

 List of governors of Kansas

Footnotes

References
Connelley, William E.  A Standard History of Kansas and Kansans (Chicago:  Lewis), 1918.

External links
 
Publications concerning Kansas Governor Humphrey's administration available via the KGI Online Library

 

Republican Party governors of Kansas
Lieutenant Governors of Kansas
Republican Party members of the Kansas House of Representatives
Republican Party Kansas state senators
Kansas state court judges
People from Massillon, Ohio
People from Independence, Kansas
1844 births
1915 deaths
University of Mount Union alumni
American Congregationalists
University of Michigan Law School alumni
19th-century American judges